'68 is a 1988 drama film directed by Steven Kovacs. The film follows a full year of a Hungarian family living in San Francisco in 1968.

Plot
 The father escaped the Soviet invasion of Budapest and now runs a Hungarian restaurant that is not doing well financially. The younger of his two sons is gay and struggling with coming out. His dad disowns him when he finally does. The older son is involved in the counterculture, gets kicked out of college, buys a motorcycle, starts dating a Maoist, and is also disowned by his father. The older of the sons runs afoul of an outlaw motorcycle club; the younger of the two sons gets drafted but is rejected because of his homosexuality. The older one joins his younger brother in a gay rights protest.

Major events of the year such as the assassination of Martin Luther King and the assassination of Robert F. Kennedy are interspersed throughout the plot and depicted in the film using stock footage.

Cast

 Eric Larson as Peter Szabo
 Robert Locke as Sandy Szabo
 Sándor Técsy as Zoltan Szabo
 Anna Dukasz as Zsuzsa Szabo
 Miran Kwun as Alana Chan
 Terra Vandergaw as Vera Kardos
 Shony Alex Braun as Tibor Kardos
 Donna Pecora as Piroska Kardos
 Elizabeth De Charay as Gizi Horvath
 Jan Nemec as Dezso Horvath
 Rusdi Lane as Bela Csontos
 Nike Doukas as Beatrice
 Neil Young as Westy
 Frank X. Mur as Officer
 Joel Parker as Protester
 Paul Pedrol as Client
James Russel

Release and reception
'68 was first shown at the AFI Los Angeles International Film Festival during March 11–26, 1987. Ben Kallen praised Neil Young's cameo performance in the LA Weekly's collection of reviews, but found the film clichéd. The film was then regionally released on May 6, 1988. The film was also shown at the Deauville Film Festival in September 1988 in which Steven Kovacs was nominated for the Critics' Award. Reviewers found the movie to be nostalgic but lacking in substance. Michael Sragow of The San Francisco Examiner found the screenplay "over-stuffed" and "strident." Michael H. Price at the Fort Worth Star-Telegram praised the film's historical accuracy and camera work, but found the film tortured. Time Out says "Kovacs' episodic attempt to evoke the trippy, dippy and momentous days of '68... finally peters out in a bathetic happy resolution of sorts."

References

External links
 

1988 drama films
1988 LGBT-related films
1988 films
American drama films
American LGBT-related films
1980s English-language films
Hungarian drama films
Hungarian LGBT-related films
LGBT-related drama films
Films set in 1968
Gay-related films
1980s American films